Several Canadian naval units have been named HMCS Skeena.
  (I) was a River-class destroyer active from 1931–1944.
  (II) was a  escort active from 1957–1993.

The 116 Skeena Sea Cadets Corps (RCSCC Skeena) of the Royal Canadian Sea Cadets was named in honour of  the first HMCS Skeena in 1941. The cadet unit has artifacts from the ship including the first ship's bell.

Battle honours
 Atlantic 1939–44
 Normandy 1944
 Biscay 1944

References

Royal Canadian Navy ship names